Kaci or KACI may refer to:

People
 Kaci Battaglia (born 1987), American singer
 Kaci Brown (born 1988), American pop and R&B singer
 Kaci Kullmann Five (1951–2017), Norwegian politician and business professional
 Mohamed Aït Kaci (born 1986), Algerian footballer
 Kaci Aitchison, anchor and features reporter for Q13 FOX News
 Aurélie Kaci (born 1989), French football midfielder and defender
 Benet Kaci (born 1978), Kosovan journalist and talk host
 Eklent Kaçi (born 1999), Albanian pool player
 Kaci Walfall (born 2004), American actress

Places
 Kaci-badon, California, former Pomo settlement in Lake County, California

Other
 KACI (AM), a radio station (1300 AM) licensed to The Dalles, Oregon, United States
 KACI-FM, a radio station (97.7 FM) licensed to The Dalles, Oregon, United States